Sachith Peiris (born October 04, 1986) is a Sri Lankan award-winning music director, playback singer and a video director.

Career
Peiris's career began in 2005. His first chart-topping hit song, "Namal Mitak" sung by Randhir Witana, became a new hope for the Sri Lankan music industry.

Peiris joined SaReGaMa Productions in 2005 and became its CEO, making it the number one music production house in the country.

Awards
His work has been nominated for several national and international awards.

 Sumathi Sammana 2011 - Gold award for Lanwa Steel Corporation TVC in the best commercial category
 Effies Awards -  Pass it On When Your Done with It silver award (Sri Lanka Eye Donation awareness video )
 7+ 2009 - Best TVC for Mobitel Kiri Ammawaru (chosen among 100,000 commercials worldwide)
 Spikes Singapore 2009 - Finalist - Mobitel Kiri Ammawaru Sumathi Sammana 2009 - Gold for Mobitel Kin Ammawaru Reggies 2007 - Best Original Composition for Hilton Kottu Song
 Chillies 2009 - Silver Award for best TV commercial for Mobitel Kiri Ammawaru
 Chillies 2008 Bronze Award for best TV commercial for Mobitel Thematic

Music productions and songs
He had the chance of working closely with Hariharan with his projects, "Jathika Govi Geethaya" written by Wasantha Dukgannarala and sung by many senior Sri Lankan artists such as Bathiya and Santhush, Iraj Weeraratne, Nirosha Virajini, Athula Adhikari, Rohana Baddage, Wasantha Dukgannarala and Gayantha with Sachith.

Sachith's commercial music productions:   
 South Asian Beach Games 2011 theme song
 Hiru Fm, Y Fm, Sooriyan Fm, Neth Fm and V Fm station jingles
 Ceat Cricket Awards 2010 theme song
 Sirasa TV One Nation One Cup World Cup song
 Swarnawahini Mega Star theme song
 Re Mix Song (Rani Mukherji) - Sachith
 Govi Geethaya
 Namal Mitak - Randhir Withana
 Madu Suwandak - Umara and Sachith
 Sihine - Prathap, Shamir and Sachith
Parana Nadagam - Sachith ft. Umara

References

External links 
 Sachith Peiris Official Facebook
 Sachith Peiris official website

Living people
Sinhalese musicians
Sri Lankan singer-songwriters
Alumni of Royal College, Colombo
Alumni of Northumbria University
1986 births
Sinhalese singers